István Antos (25 June 1908 - 5 January 1960) was a Hungarian politician, who served as Minister of Finance from 1957 until his death. He joined the Hungarian Communist Party in 1945. He had a significant role in the reorganizing of the economical system. He served as general secretary of the National Economical Council. From 1945, he was the state secretary of the Ministry of Finance. From 1953, he was member of the National Assembly of Hungary.

References
 Magyar Életrajzi Lexikon

1908 births
1960 deaths
Politicians from Trnava
People from the Kingdom of Hungary
Hungarians in Slovakia
Hungarian Communist Party politicians
Members of the Hungarian Working People's Party
Members of the Hungarian Socialist Workers' Party
Finance ministers of Hungary
Members of the National Assembly of Hungary (1949–1953)
Members of the National Assembly of Hungary (1953–1958)
Members of the National Assembly of Hungary (1958–1963)
20th-century  Hungarian economists